Schröder's equation, named after Ernst Schröder, is a functional equation with one independent variable:  given the function , find the function  such that

Functional significance
This is one of the first steps in a long line of theorems fruitful for understanding composition operators on analytic function spaces,  cf. Koenigs function.

Equations such as Schröder's are suitable to encoding self-similarity, and have thus been extensively utilized in studies of nonlinear dynamics (often referred to colloquially as chaos theory). It is also used in studies of turbulence, as well as the renormalization group.

The change of variables  (the Abel function) further converts Schröder's equation to the older Abel equation, . Similarly, the change of variables  converts Schröder's equation to Böttcher's equation, .

Moreover, for the velocity,    Julia's equation,     , holds.

The -th power of a solution of Schröder's equation provides a solution of Schröder's equation with eigenvalue , instead. In the same vein, for an invertible solution  of Schröder's equation, the (non-invertible) function  is also a solution, for any periodic function  with period . All solutions of Schröder's equation are related in this manner.

Solutions
Schröder's equation was solved analytically if  is an attracting (but not superattracting)

In the case of a superattracting fixed point, Schröder's equation is unwieldy, and had best be transformed to Böttcher's equation.

There are a good number of particular solutions dating back to Schröder's original 1870 paper.

The series expansion around a fixed point and the relevant convergence properties of the solution for the resulting orbit and its analyticity properties are cogently summarized by Szekeres. Several of the solutions are furnished in terms of asymptotic series, cf. Carleman matrix.

Applications

It is used to analyse discrete dynamical systems by finding a new coordinate system in which the system (orbit) generated by h(x) looks simpler, a mere dilation.

 equation.

That is, .

In general, all of its functional iterates (its regular iteration group, see iterated function) are provided by the orbit

for  real — not necessarily positive or integer. (Thus a full continuous group.)

For example, special cases of the logistic map such as the chaotic case  were already worked out by Schröder in his original article (p. 306),

In fact, this solution is seen to result as motion dictated by a sequence of switchback potentials, a generic feature of continuous iterates effected by Schröder's equation.

A nonchaotic case he also illustrated with his method, yields  
 , and hence .

Likewise, for the Beverton–Holt model, one readily finds  , so that

See also 

 Böttcher's equation

References

Functional equations
Mathematical physics